Halalkalibacillus  is a Gram-positive, rod-shaped, moderately halophilic, alkaliphilic, aerobic and motile genus of bacteria from the family of Bacillaceae with one known species (Halalkalibacillus halophilus).

References

Bacillaceae
Bacteria genera
Monotypic bacteria genera